Piraeus is a city in the Attica, Greece. 

Piraeus may also refer to:

Companies
 Piraeus Bank
Piraeus Bank Romania
Piraeus Bank Tower Bucharest
 Piraeus Port Authority
 Piraeus Container Terminal, a subsidiary of COSCO

Museums
Archaeological Museum of Piraeus
Municipal Art Gallery of Piraeus

Sports
Olympiacos Piraeus, a multisport club and its departments:
Olympiacos F.C.
Olympiacos B.C.
Olympiacos S.C.
Olympiacos Water Polo Club
Olympiacos CFP (Superleague Formula team)
Ethnikos Piraeus, a multisport club and its departments:
Ethnikos Piraeus F.C.
Ethnikos Piraeus Water Polo Club
Piraeus Football Clubs Association
Athens-Piraeus Football Clubs Association

Transport
Piraeus station
Athens-Piraeus Electric Railway
Port of Piraeus
Piraeus, Athens and Peloponnese Railways
Piraeus-Perama light railway
Piraeus Railway Works

Other
Piraeus A and Piraeus B, parliamentary constituencies
Piraeus Prefecture
Piraeus Lion
University of Piraeus
Battle of Piraeus
Pireus (mythology)